Sara Villani (born 19 September 1996) is a Canadian bobsledder.

Career
Villani began her athletic career as a heptathlete, but in 2018 she was identified at the TBC Training Ground as a potential brakewoman in bobsleigh. Villani made her IBSF World Cup debut in January 2021, finishing in a career-best fourth with Christine de Bruin. At the IBSF World Championships 2021, Villani finished in 16th place with Christine de Bruin in the two-woman event.

In January 2022, Villani was named to Canada's 2022 Olympic team.

References

1996 births
Living people
Canadian female bobsledders
Sportspeople from Mississauga
Bobsledders at the 2022 Winter Olympics
Olympic bobsledders of Canada
21st-century Canadian women